Renbrook School is an independent, private day school in West Hartford, Connecticut. Founded in 1935, Renbrook is an independent day school for students in three divisions; Beginning School for students in preschool through kindergarten, Lower School for grades 1-4, and Upper School for grades 5-8. With over 300 students, class sizes of 10–15 are typical. Located on over 75-acres atop Avon Mountain, the main building was originally the home of Frederick Rentschler. 0o[erter[

Notable alumni

The alumni association includes over 2,400 graduates from Renbrook and the Junior School.

References

External links 
 Renbrook School

Private middle schools in Connecticut
Private elementary schools in Connecticut
Buildings and structures in West Hartford, Connecticut
Schools in Hartford County, Connecticut